The Turkmen Soviet Socialist Republic (Turkmenskaya Sovetskaya Sotsialisticheskaya Respublika), also known as Soviet Turkmenistan, the Turkmen SSR, Turkmenistan, or Turkmenia, was one of the constituent republics of the Soviet Union located in Central Asia existed as a republic from 1925 to 1991. Initially, on 7 August 1921, it was established as the Turkmen Oblast of the Turkestan ASSR before being made, on 13 May 1925, a separate republic of the USSR as the Turkmen SSR.

Since then the borders of the Turkmenia were unchanged. On 22 August 1990, Turkmenia declared its sovereignty over Soviet laws. On 27 October 1991, it became independent as Turkmenistan.

Geographically, Turkmenia was bordered between Iran, Afghanistan to the south, Caspian Sea to the west, the Kazakh SSR to the north and the Uzbek SSR to the east.

History

Annexation to Russia
Russian attempts to encroach upon Turkmen territory began in earnest in the latter part of the nineteenth century. In 1869 the Russian Empire established a foothold in present-day Turkmenistan with the foundation of the Caspian Sea port of Krasnovodsk (now Türkmenbaşy). From there and other points, they marched on and subdued the Khiva Khanate in 1873. Because Turkmen tribes, most notably the Yomud, were in the military service of the Khivan khan, Russian forces undertook punitive raids against Khorazm, in the process slaughtering hundreds of Turkmen and destroying their settlements. In 1881 the Russians under General Mikhail Skobelev besieged and captured Geok Tepe, one of the last Turkmen strongholds, northwest of Ashgabat. With the Turkmen defeat (which is now marked by the Turkmen as a national day of mourning and a symbol of national pride), the annexation of what is present-day Turkmenistan met with only weak resistance. Later the same year, the Russians signed the Treaty of Akhal with Qajar Iran and established what essentially remains the current border between Turkmenistan and Iran. In 1897 a similar agreement was signed between the Russians and Afghans.

Following annexation to Russia, the area was administered as the Transcaspian Region by corrupt and malfeasant military officers and officials appointed by the Turkestan Governor-Generalship in Tashkent. In the 1880s, a railroad was built from Krasnovodsk to Ashgabat and later extended to Tashkent. Urban areas began to develop along the railway. Although the Transcaspian Region essentially was a colony of Russia, it remained a backwater, except for Russian concerns with British colonialist intentions in the region and with possible uprisings by the Turkmen.

Creation of an SSR
Because the Turkmen generally were indifferent to the advent of Soviet rule in 1917, little revolutionary activity occurred in the region in the years that followed. However, the years immediately preceding the revolution had been marked by sporadic Turkmen uprisings against Russian rule, most prominently the anti-tsarist revolt of 1916 that swept through the whole of Turkestan. Their armed resistance to Soviet rule was part of the larger Basmachi Revolt throughout Central Asia from the 1920s into the early 1930s, which included most of the future USSR dependencies. Opposition was fierce and resulted in the death of large numbers of Turkmen. Soviet sources describe this struggle as a minor chapter in the republic's history.

In October 1924, when Central Asia was divided into distinct ethno-national political entities, the Transcaspian Oblast of the Turkestan Autonomous Soviet Socialist Republic (Turkestan ASSR) along with the Charjew, Kerki and a part of the Shirabad provinces of the Bukharan People's Republic and the Turkmen (Daşoguz) province of Khorezm People's Republic were unified to create the Turkmen Soviet Socialist Republic (Turkmen SSR), a full-fledged constituent republic of the Soviet Union where Turkmen made up roughly 80% of the population. During the forced collectivization and settlement of nomadic and semi-nomadic groups along with other socioeconomic changes of the first decades of Soviet rule, pastoral nomadism ceased to be an economic alternative in Turkmenistan, and by the late 1930s, the majority of Turkmen had become sedentary. Efforts by the Soviet state to undermine the traditional Turkmen way of life resulted in significant changes in familial and political relationships, religious and cultural observances, and intellectual developments. Significant numbers of Russians and other Europeans, as well as groups from various nationalities mainly from the Caucasus, migrated to urban areas. Modest industrial capabilities were developed, and limited exploitation of Turkmenistan's natural resources was initiated.

Under Soviet rule, all religious beliefs were attacked by the communist authorities as superstition and "vestiges of the past". Most religious schooling and religious observance were banned, and the vast majority of mosques were closed. An official Muslim Board of Central Asia with a headquarters in Tashkent was established during World War II to supervise the Islamic faith in Central Asia. For the most part, the Muslim Board functioned as an instrument of propaganda whose activities did little to enhance the Muslim cause. Atheist indoctrination stifled religious development and contributed to the isolation of the Turkmen from the international Muslim community. Some religious customs, such as Muslim burial and male circumcision, continued to be practiced throughout the Soviet period, but most religious belief, knowledge, and customs were preserved only in rural areas in "folk form" as a kind of unofficial Islam not sanctioned by the state-run Spiritual Directorate.

Pre-independence

The Soviet regime's policy of indigenization (korenizatsiia) involved the promotion of national culture and language and the creation of a native administration for each ethnic group in its own territory. During the 1920s, as happened throughout the Soviet Union, there was forthright support and funding for the creation of native language theatres, publishing houses, newspapers as well as universal public schooling, and this was the case for the Turkmen minorities during Soviet administration of Turkmen/Transcaspian province of the Turkestan ASSR and the Bukharan People's Republic and the Khorezm (Kivan) People's Republic and continued after the creation of the majority-Turkmen national republic. 

In the 1920s the Turkmen SSR standardised the Turkmen language (as prior to this, the vast majority of the population was not literate and those that were tended to use the Chaghtai or Persian languages for writing, though in the late 19th and early 20th century there was growing interest in the use of Ottoman Turkish register for writing as it is an Oghuz language and closer linguistically). Rigorous debate in the national press and in various literary and educational journals over Teke, Yomut, and other regional and tribal dialects was followed by centralised decision-making around the creation of a particular national standard, the simplification of the Arabo-Persian alphabet, and the eventual transition to the Cyrillic alphabet.

Beginning in the 1930s, Moscow kept the republic under firm control. The nationalities policy of the Communist Party of the Soviet Union (CPSU) fostered the development of a Turkmen political elite and promoted Russification. The previous nationality policies of the 1920s and early 1930s involved promoting the use of the Turkmen language for administration in all areas of the state, party, and economy (along with the longer-lasting system of preferential quotas and advancement for ethnic Turkmen in government, party, and industrial jobs with the aim of achieving a majority Turkmen bureaucracy) and attempts at requiring non-Turkmen to learn the Turkmen language. From the 1930s onward, the nationality policy favoured use of the Turkmen language in areas of government "closest to the people": education, health, etc, paired with an acceptance that knowledge of the Russian language would be required for most government work as well as advancement in many careers: the government would no longer work to make knowledge of Russian superfluous to advancement and would cease active efforts to have Turkmen be the language of administration, and from 1938 onwards non-Russian students throughout the Soviet Union would be required to become fluent in Russian in order to advance through secondary and tertiary education.

Non-Turkmen cadre both in Moscow and Turkmenia closely supervised the national cadre of government officials and bureaucrats; generally, the Turkmen leadership staunchly supported Soviet policies. Moscow initiated nearly all political activity in the republic, and, except for a corruption scandal in the mid-1980s that ousted longtime First Secretary Muhammetnazar Gapurow, Turkmenistan remained a quiet Soviet republic. Mikhail Gorbachev's policies of glasnost and perestroika did not have a significant impact on Turkmenistan, as many people there were self-dependent, and settlers of the territory and the Soviet Union's ministers rarely intertwined. The republic found itself rather unprepared for the dissolution of the Soviet Union and the independence that followed in 1991.

When other constituent republics of the Soviet Union advanced claims to sovereignty in 1988 and 1989, Turkmenia's leadership also began to criticize Moscow's economic and political policies as exploitative and detrimental to the well-being and pride of the Turkmen. By a unanimous vote of its Supreme Soviet, Turkmenistan declared its sovereignty in August 1990. In March 1990, Turkmenistan participated in the internationally-observed referendum on the future of the Soviet Union, where 98% percent of participants voted in support of the preservation of the Soviet Union. After the August 1991 coup in Moscow, Turkmenia's communist leader Saparmurat Niyazov called for a popular referendum on independence. The official result of the referendum was 94 percent in favor of independence. The republic's Supreme Soviet then declared Turkmenistan's independence from the Soviet Union and the establishment of the Republic of Turkmenistan on 27 October 1991. Turkmenistan gained independence from the Soviet Union on 26 December 1991.

Politics

As with the other Soviet republics, Turkmenistan had followed the Marxist–Leninist ideology governed by the republic's sole party, Communist Party of Turkmenistan, a republican branch of the Communist Party of the Soviet Union.

The politics of Turkmenistan took place in the framework of a one-party socialist republic. The Supreme Soviet was a unicameral legislature of the republic headed by a Chairman, with its superiority to both the executive and judicial branches and its members meet in Ashkhabad.

Political leadership

First Secretaries of the Communist Party of Turkmenistan
Ivan Mezhlauk (19 November 1924 – 1926) 
Shaymardan Ibragimov (June 1926 – 1927)
Nikolay Paskutsky (1927 – 1928)
Grigory Aronshtam (11 May 1928 – August 1930)
Yakov Popok (August 1930 – 15 April 1937)
Anna Mukhamedov (April – October 1937)
Yakov Chubin (October 1937 – November 1939)
Mikhail Fonin (November 1939 – March 1947)
Shadzha Batyrov (March 1947 – July 1951)
Sukhan Babayev (July 1951 – 14 December 1958)
Dzhuma Durdy Karayev (14 December 1958 – 4 May 1960)
Balysh Ovezov (13 June 1960 – 24 December 1969)
Muhammetnazar Gapurow (24 December 1969 – 21 December 1985)
Saparmurat Niyazov (21 December 1985 – 16 December 1991)

Chairmen of the Council of People's Commissars
Kaikhaziz Atabayev (20 February 1925 – 8 July 1937)
Aitbay Khudaybergenov (October 1937 – 17 October 1945)
Sukhan Babayev (17 October 1945 – 15 March 1946)

Chairmen of the Council of Ministers
Sukhan Babayev (15 March 1946 – 14 July 1951)
Balysh Ovezov (14 July 1951 – 14 January 1958) (1st time)
Dzhuma Durdy Karayev (14 January 1958 – 20 January 1959)
Balysh Ovezov (20 January 1959 – 13 June 1960) (2nd time)
Abdy Annaliyev (13 June 1960 – 26 March 1963)
Muhammetnazar Gapurow (26 March 1963 – 25 December 1969)
Oraz Orazmuhammedow (25 December 1969 – 17 December 1975)
Bally Yazkuliyev (17 December 1975 – 15 December 1978)
Chary Karriyev (15 December 1978 – 26 March 1985)
Saparmurat Niyazov (26 March 1985 – 4 January 1986)
Annamurat Hojamyradow (4 January 1986 – 17 November 1989)
Han Ahmedow (5 December 1989 – 27 October 1991)

Notes

References 
 
Kurbanov, Seitnazar. 1982. “Information and Bibliographical Activities of the Leading Libraries of the Turkmen SSR.” Libri: International Journal of Libraries & Information Services 32 (June): 81–90.

 
Former socialist republics
Republics of the Soviet Union
Communism in Turkmenistan
States and territories established in 1921
States and territories established in 1925
States and territories disestablished in 1991
1925 disestablishments in the Soviet Union
1991 disestablishments in the Soviet Union